Chaffinch is a name applied to some birds in the genus Fringilla and may refer to:

 Common chaffinch (Fringilla coelebs)
 La Palma chaffinch (F. c. palmae)
 Madeiran chaffinch (F. c. maderensis)
 Gran Canaria blue chaffinch (Fringilla polatzeki)
 Tenerife blue chaffinch (Fringilla teydea)

See also
 USS Chaffinch, multiple ships of that name